RoXaN  (Rotavirus 'X'-associated non-structural protein) also known as ZC3H7B (zinc finger CCCH-type containing 7B), is a protein that in humans is encoded by the ZC3H7B gene. RoXaN is a protein that contains tetratricopeptide repeat and leucine-aspartate repeat as well as zinc finger domains. This protein also interacts with the rotavirus non-structural protein NSP3.

Function 

Rotavirus mRNAs are capped but not polyadenylated, and viral proteins are translated by the cellular translation machinery. This is accomplished through the action of the viral Nonstructural Protein NSP3 which specifically binds the 3' consensus sequence of viral mRNAs and interacts with the eukaryotic translation initiation factor eIF4G I.

RoXaN (rotavirus X protein associated with NSP3) is 110-kDa cellular protein that contains a minimum of three regions predicted to be involved in protein–protein or nucleic acid–protein interactions. A tetratricopeptide repeat region, a protein–protein interaction domain most often found in multiprotein complexes, is present in the amino-terminal region. In the carboxy terminus, at least five zinc finger motifs are observed, further suggesting the capacity of RoXaN to bind other proteins or nucleic acids. Between these two regions exists a paxillin leucine-aspartate repeat (LD) motif which is involved in protein–protein interactions.

Clinical significance 

RoXaN is capable of interacting with NSP3 in vivo and during rotavirus infection. Domains of interaction correspond to the dimerization domain of NSP3 (amino acids 163 to 237) and the LD domain of RoXaN (amino acids 244 to 341). The interaction between NSP3 and RoXaN does not impair the interaction between NSP3 and eIF4G I, and a ternary complex made of NSP3, RoXaN, and eIF4G I can be detected in rotavirus-infected cells, implicating RoXaN in translation regulation.

Expression of RoXaN was found to be correlated with a higher tumor grad in GIST (gastrointestinal stromal tumors).

References

Further reading

Gene expression
RNA-binding proteins
Rotaviruses
TPR domain